A world map is a map of Earth.

World map may also refer to:

International Map of the World, an international project to produce topographic maps of terrestrial portions of Earth at the one to one million scale
Overworld, an area within a video game that interconnects all its levels or locations in

See also
A Map of the World, a novel by Jane Hamilton
"Map Of The World", a song Marillion from the album Anoraknophobia
World
Portal:Atlas